Natalia Altea Jiménez Sarmento (born 29 December 1981), known professionally as Natalia Jiménez is a Spanish singer-songwriter that started her musical career in the 2000s as vocalist of La Quinta Estación. Her first disc as a soloist was titled Natalia Jiménez. She has received Grammy and Latin Grammy Awards and has sold more than 3 million albums worldwide, during her solo career. She has recorded duets with the main stars of Latin music, including Marc Anthony, Daddy Yankee and Ricky Martin among others.

Career
Jimenez began her career playing in the subway and on the streets of Madrid at age 15.

In 2001, she signed an agreement with BMG Entertainment and became the lead singer of La Quinta Estación, with which she managed to achieve success in Spain, Mexico and the United States thanks to the albums Flores de Alquiler, El Mundo Se Equivoca y Sin Frenos.

After living in Mexico for more than eight years, Natalia moved to Miami to devote time to an album on which she debuted as a soloist, Natalia Jiménez, released on 21 June 2011. The album debuted at the number one position on the iTunes Latin Pop list and with it, the singer received the “Female artist of the year” nomination for the Billboard Latin Music Awards. In early 2012 she won the Premio Lo Nuestro  for "Revelation of the year ".

Her second solo album, Creo en Mi, was released on 17 March 2015 and reached the number one position in Puerto Rico and number two on the Billboard Latin Albums chart. In addition, she received two Latin Grammy nominations in the categories Album of the Year ("Creo en mí") and Song of the year ("Quédate con ella").

In 2016, Jiménez celebrated the work of the Mexican-American diva, Jenni Rivera, in her third solo album: Tributo a la gran señora.

In 2019, she released the single "Nunca Es Tarde", which she recorded with Jesús Navarro, vocalist of Reik, and composed with Claudia Brant and Jayson DeZuzio. The same theme became the main song of the second season of the Televisa and Univision serie, Amar Sin Ley.

In August 2019, Jiménez released an album of rancheras entitled México de mi corazón, produced by Armando Ávila. In seven months, the material reached the top positions in the lists of musical successes in Mexico and the United States, and it has earned it a Gold Record and more than 55 million reproductions worldwide.

México de mi corazón is an album that honors the Mexican song and features duets with voices such as Carlos Rivera, Pedro Fernández, Paquita la del Barrio, Lila Downs, El Bebeto and Banda MS. Mariachi Gama Mil provides musical accompaniment, and Natalia was granted permission to incorporate choirs with Juan Gabriel.

Jiménez served as coach for three seasons of La Voz Kids USA, where she won twice and also as coach of La Voz...Mexico. In 2020, Natalia returned to Spain where she served as judge of the reality show Operación Triunfo.. In 2021, she was on the Colombian Kids and Senior version of La Voz, winning both of the series. She is currently tied with the 2nd most wins female coach on The Voice, same as Sarah Geronimo, Kelly Clarkson and Pelageya on Philippine, American and Russian series.

Personal life
Natalia Jiménez was born on 29 December 1981 in Madrid to a Spanish father and Portuguese mother (who were both musicians). 
 
In 2009, Jiménez had a wedding scheduled with her fiancé, businessman Antonio Alcol. The wedding was canceled and the couple broke up.
 
In 2016, Jiménez announced her surprise wedding to her longtime boyfriend and manager, Daniel Trueba. She states she wanted something private for her wedding without the media knowing until after the event. She and Trueba have a daughter, who was born on 21 October 2016. On 8 January 2021, she announced her and Trueba were going through a divorce and that they had been separated for several months.
 
Jiménez resides between Miami, Florida and Mexico City, Mexico with frequent visits to her family in Madrid.

Discography

Studio albums

Studio albums with La Quinta Estacion

Compilations and live albums

Footnotes:
1 Based on the Billboard Top Latin Albums chart.

Special appearances
2002 - Clase 406 soundtrack
2002 - Tributo a los Hombres G
2003 - Dame Tu Cuerpo soundtrack
2006 - Now Esto Es Musica! Latino
2015 - La Voz Kids
2018 - La Voz... México

Singles
As a solo artist:

with La Quinta Estación:

Featured singles

Awards and nominations

Latin Billboard Music Awards

References

External links
 

1981 births
Living people
Singers from Madrid
Spanish people of Portuguese descent
Spanish people of Romani descent
Women in Latin music
Sony Music Latin artists
Latin music songwriters
21st-century Spanish singers
21st-century Spanish women singers